Physciella is a genus of lichen-forming fungi in the family Physciaceae. Circumscribed in 1986, it is distinguished from the similar genera Physcia and Phaeophyscia by its prosoplectenchymatous (comprising long narrow wavy parallel hyphae) lower cortex, the lack of the secondary metabolite atranorin in the upper cortex, and short, ellipsoid conidia.

References

Caliciales
Lichen genera
Caliciales genera
Taxa described in 1986